Bibasis oedipodea, the branded orange awlet, is a species of hesperid butterfly found in South Asia and Southeast Asia. The butterfly was reassigned to the genus Burara by Vane-Wright and de Jong (2003) and is considered by them to be Burara oedipodea.

Range
The branded orange awlet is found in India, Sri Lanka, Myanmar, Malaysia, Java, Thailand and Vietnam. In India, the butterfly is found along the Himalayas from Mussoorie to Assam. The type locality is Java in Indonesia.

Description

The butterfly has a wingspan of 40 to 50 mm for subspecies ataphus found in Sri Lanka, and of 65 to 70 mm in subspecies excellens found in Sulawesi.

Edward Yerbury Watson (1891) gives a detailed description:

Biology
This butterfly is crepuscular. The larva have been recorded on Hiptage benghalensis and Combretum latifolium.

Cited references

Brower, Andrew V. Z. and Warren, Andrew, (2007). Coeliadinae Evans 1937. Version 21 February 2007 (temporary). http://tolweb.org/Coeliadinae/12150/2007.02.21 in The Tree of Life Web Project, http://tolweb.org/

oediopodea
Butterflies of Asia
Butterflies described in 1820
Butterflies of Indonesia